Angelio Somalo (born 16 October 1896, date of death unknown) was a Spanish equestrian. He competed in two events at the 1928 Summer Olympics.

References

1896 births
Year of death missing
Spanish male equestrians
Olympic equestrians of Spain
Equestrians at the 1928 Summer Olympics
Place of birth missing